Strigatella flavocingulata is a species of sea snail, a marine gastropod mollusk in the miter snail family.

Distribution
Pacific Ocean: Easter Island. 
Chile, Valparaiso, Isla de Pascua.

Habitat
Sandy areas among seagrass, in tide pools.

References

Mitridae
Gastropods described in 1938